The WWA World Heavyweight Championship (Campeonato Mundial Peso Completo WWA in Spanish) is a professional wrestling world heavyweight championship promoted by the Mexican Lucha Libre wrestling based promotion World Wrestling Association (WWA) since 1986. As the Championship was designated as a heavyweight title, the Championship can only officially be competed for by wrestlers weighing at least . However, as with most heavyweight titles the "minimum" weight requirement is often ignored.

As it was a professional wrestling championship, the championship was not won not by actual competition, but by a scripted ending to a match determined by the bookers and match makers. On occasion the promotion declares a championship vacant, which means there is no champion at that point in time. This can either be due to a storyline, or real life issues such as a champion suffering an injury being unable to defend the championship, or leaving the company.

Bill Anderson was the first champion, defeating Tinieblas in the finals of a tournament on October 4, 1986. Perro Aguayo is the wrestler that has held the championship the most times, three, Mil Mascaras is the only other wrestler to have won the title more than once. The current champion is Rayo de Jalisco, Jr., having defeated Rey Misterio, Sr. in a tournament final on March 21, 2003. Since the WWA titles have been largely unsanctioned since the late 1990s it means that they can be defended on any wrestling show, not just limited to WWA promoted shows.

Title history

Footnotes

References

External links
W.W.A. World Heavyweight Title (Mexico)
WWA World Heavyweight Title

World heavyweight wrestling championships
World Wrestling Association (Mexico) Championships